The 1962 Paris–Tours was the 56th edition of the Paris–Tours cycle race and was held on 7 October 1962. The race started in Paris and finished in Tours. The race was won by Jo de Roo.

General classification

References

1962 in French sport
1962
1962 Super Prestige Pernod
October 1962 sports events in Europe